Alberto Remedios  (27 February 193511 June 2016) was a British operatic tenor, especially noted for his interpretations of Wagner's heldentenor roles.

Biography
Alberto Remedios was born in Liverpool and began his working life as a shipyard welder. He left school at 15 to play football semi-professionally for New Brighton at Wallasey. He also studied singing with Edwin Francis, who also taught Rita Hunter. Following National Service, he was offered a place at the Royal College of Music with Clive Carey, where he won the Queen's Prize in 1957. He sang a wide variety of roles with the Sadler's Wells Opera—the forerunner of English National Opera—including Alfredo in La traviata, the title role in Gounod's Faust, Samson in Saint-Saëns' Samson and Delilah, Bacchus in Ariadne auf Naxos and Max in Der Freischütz.

Remedios went to Australia with the Sutherland-Williamson company in 1965. The company led by Richard Bonynge included Lauris Elms, John Alexander, and Luciano Pavarotti. The offer to tour came about by chance. Remedios, dining in an Italian restaurant in London was offered a free meal if he sang; fortuitously Joan Sutherland was also in the restaurant that night. The tour included La traviata, Lucia di Lammermoor, Semiramide and Faust. A recording of Remedios singing Alfredo in La traviata, with Joan Sutherland's Violetta, was released by Desiree Records in 2014.

He is especially remembered for his performances in Wagner, especially as Siegfried in the Glen Byam Shaw production of The Ring, conducted by Reginald Goodall. He was the first English tenor to sing Siegfried at Covent Garden since Walter Widdop in the 1930s. These performances were recorded in 1973, preserving Remedios' partnerships with Norman Bailey as Wotan and Rita Hunter as Brünnhilde. He was also memorable as Walther von Stolzing in the ground-breaking 1968 Sadler's Wells The Mastersingers of Nuremberg, also conducted by Reginald Goodall.

Most remarkable of all was the occasion when Remedios, despite a slight chest infection, and due to the illness of another singer, played the roles of both Siegmund in Die Walküre, the title role in Siegfried, and also Siegfried in Götterdämmerung, within a complete cycle of the Ring during one week, these being at the Empire Theatre, Liverpool performances of the tour.

Remedios sang the role of Mark in the first recording of Tippett's The Midsummer Marriage.

Remedios performed in many of the world's leading operatic venues, including the Metropolitan Opera in New York City, Seattle, Frankfurt, San Francisco and Buenos Aires.

He was the subject of This Is Your Life in 1976 when he was surprised by Eamonn Andrews.

Recordings
Tippett: The Midsummer Marriage  Mark, in the first recording .
Excerpts from Semiramide, Faust, La Traviata, La Sonnambula. Joan Sutherland, Elizabeth Harwood, Monica Sinclair, Lauris Elms; Luciano Pavarotti, John Alexander, Alberto Remedios, Opthof, Rouleau, Cross, others. Sutherland-Williamson Grand Opera Company Orchestra and Chorus, Bonynge/Weibel. Desirée Records CD 2965 (Norbeck, Peters & Ford, dist., 802-868-9300)
Bizet: Carmen (In English) - Pring, Remedios, Curphey, Chard; Braithwaite. London, 1975
Cilea: Adriana Lecouvreur (In English) - Carlyle, Remedios, Bainbridge; Erede. London, 1971
Massenet: Manon (In English) - Harwood, Remedios, Chard, Blackburn, Dowling; Mackerras. London, 1974
Wagner: Die Walküre (In English) - Hunter, June, Bailey, Remedios, Howard, Grant; Goodall. ENO, 1970
Wagner: Götterdämmerung (In English) - Hunter, Remedios, Grant, Bailey, Hammond-Stroud; Goodall. ENO, 1971
Wagner: Lohengrin (In English) - Remedios, Curphey, Turner, Sharpe, Herincx, Grant; Braithwaite. London, 1971
Wagner: Siegfried (In English) - Remedios, Hunter, Garrard, Dempsey, Hammond-Stroud, Grant, Masterson; Goodall. London, 1973
Wagner: The Ring Cycle (In English) Hunter, Remedios, Bailey/Garrard; Goodall/Mackerras.  London, 1970- 1973
Wagner: Lohengrin sung in English; Lohengrin – Alberto Remedios, Elsa – Karen Bureau, Ortrud – Nance Grant, Telramund – Geoffrey Chard, King Henry – Noel Mangin, Herald – David Brennan; Melbourne Symphony Orchestra, conductor Richard Divall. Australian Radio Broadcast November 1985. CD91241
Hector Berlioz: Les Troyens –  sung in English; Margreta Elkins (Cassandre), Robert Allman (Chorèbe), Alberto Remedios (Enée), Suzanne Johnston (Ascagne), Lauris Elms (Didon), Heather Begg (Anna), Richard Greager (Iopas/Helenus), Noel Mangin (Priam/Narbal), John Wood (Panthée); Melbourne Symphony Orchestra, Melbourne Chorale & Victoria State Opera Chorus, Richard Divall

Personal life, retirement, and death
He married his second wife, Judy Hosken, an Australian dancer, in 1965. Remedios performed regularly in Australia – he sang in concert performances of Götterdämmerung at the Sydney Opera House in the late 1970s with Rita Hunter, conducted by Sir Charles Mackerras, and sang Lohengrin for Victoria State Opera in 1985 conducted by Richard Divall, in a production by August Everding. His brother Ramon also had a singing career as a tenor; on many occasions they both appeared in performances by English National Opera of The Mastersingers. In 1999 Remedios emigrated to Sydney, Australia. He died in Sydney on 11 June 2016, aged 81.

Awards
Queen's Prize, Royal College of Music, 1957.
First prize in the Bulgarian International Opera Contest, 1963.
Appointed a Commander of the Order of the British Empire (CBE), 1981.

References

External links
The Royal Opera House website tribute
Seen and Heard International tribute
English National Opera tribute

1935 births
2016 deaths
English operatic tenors
20th-century British male opera singers
21st-century British male opera singers
Alumni of the Royal College of Music
Musicians from Liverpool
Commanders of the Order of the British Empire
English people of Spanish descent
English emigrants to Australia